SCMS may refer to:

 School of Communication and Management Studies,  Kochi, India
 Scott Creek Middle School, Coquitlam, British Columbia, Canada
 Serial Copy Management System
 Sliding compound miter saw, a type of miter saw
 Smart card management system
 Society for Cinema and Media Studies
 Structured Content Management System
 Supply chain management software